Wolf Cub Village (Chinese Diary of a Madman) is a 1994 Chinese-language chamber opera in four scenes by Guo Wenjing to a libretto by Zeng Li after Lu Xun's story "Diary of a Madman".

References

Chinese western-style operas
1994 operas
Operas
Operas by Guo Wenjing
Operas set in China
Chamber operas
Operas based on literature
Adaptations of works by Lu Xun